The Battle of Tryškiai, Tryszki, or Triski, on December 14, 1701, was a small engagement between Swedish forces under Charles XII of Sweden and Polish–Lithuanian forces under Grzegorz Antoni Ogiński, in the town of Tryškiai, Samogitia (present-day Lithuania). After the Crossing of the Düna Charles went into an alliance with the Sapieha family to gain his support in dethroning Augustus II the Strong from the Polish-Lithuanian throne, in exchange for protection from rival families in Samogitia, such as the Ogiński family. After initial engagements between Swedish forces and those loyal to Grzegorz Antoni Ogiński, the Swedish king personally takes command of the troops and engages Grzegorz at the town of Tryškiai; after a brief encounter, Grzegorz is forced on the run and, with Charles being hot on his heels, eventually retreats out of Samogitia altogether. A Swedish detachment is established at Kaunas in Lithuania, as a sort of forward operating base before the inevitable Swedish invasion of Poland (1701–1706); further engagements, foremost the Battle of Darsūniškis, confirms the Swedish invasion. Although only a small action in a major war, the battle quickly sparked false rumours to be spread around Europe; one spoke of Charles' death somewhere in Lithuania, while the other mentioned a major defeat for Grzegorz, involving many thousands of participants.

Prelude
The Swedish king had, ever since the Crossing of the Düna and the conquest of Courland earlier that year, contemplated actions against the Polish–Lithuanian Commonwealth to have Augustus II, whom Charles considered as too unpredictable, dethroned. In the wake of the Lithuanian power struggle the Sapieha family pleaded for Swedish protection against, among others, the Ogiński family (supported by Augustus II), which frequently raided their estates in the Duchy of Samogitia.

Charles, who sought political support within the Commonwealth, seized the opportunity and, in September, sent two contingents as protection; 600 horse under Alexander Hummerhielm, and 200 horse under Johan August Meijerfeldt. These were frequently being harassed by Grzegorz Antoni Ogiński's forces (the governor-general of the Duchy), as a consequence. The fighting escalated as Grzegorz numbers grew larger and the two Swedish commanders soon requested reinforcements. Charles answered by assembling an additional 100 dragoons and 400 foot guards, merged the contingents together and rode out on December 12 — with only a handful of followers and without noticing the headquarters — to personally lead the combined forces in Samogitia and destroy the troubling army under Grzegorz.

Battle
On December 15, the Swedish horse reached Tryškiai, owned by the Ogiński family. Here they stumbled upon the rearguard of the Lithuanian army (2 companies) which escaped only after destroying the bridge leading into the town, forcing the Swedes to wade across the river; the bulk of the Lithuanian forces, with most of the inhabitants, had left the town just before the Swedish arrival. Once across, Charles set up camp and left merely 40 men in the town square as guards, additional outposts or patrols were forbidden. Just before midnight, at 23:00, Grzegorz launched a surprise attack on the sleeping Swedes; between 1,000 and 2,000 of his cavalry rushed into the town, uncontested, and caused panic by killing Swedish horses and igniting the houses. The town square, which was in danger of getting completely overwhelmed, was saved as dismounted Swedish dragoons arrived and forced the Lithuanians away.

Grzegorz on the run
Soon Charles personally appeared with the bulk of the cavalry and rapidly counterattacked. The battle shifted tides as more Swedish troops mobilized and the Lithuanians had, after an hourly long struggle, been defeated; they were chased for about five kilometers before the fighting stopped. Grzegorz, who had been close to being captured — in the chaotic retreat, Swedish Lieutenant colonel Claes Bonde (who would make a name for himself in the events leading up to the Battle of Warsaw, where he died) captured his timpani, servant and reserve horse, but was unable to capture Grzegorz himself — lost 140 men and retreated into Lithuania, towards Kaunas; a bunch of wounded Lithuanians were found on the following morning in the neighbouring villages. The Swedes, who had 10 men killed and 18 wounded, struck camp on December 17, as soon as the weather allowed and the wounded had been sent home, to give chase. Kelmė, another town owned by the Ogiński family, was ravaged and burnt down by the Swedes in their pursue of the Lithuanian hetman.

Aftermath
While the complete destruction of Grzegorz' forces had failed, they had been successfully forced out of Samogitia; although they soon returned to Kaunas' vicinity and fought several skirmishes with the Swedish troops posted there. Nonetheless, an important Swedish forward operating base in Lithuania had been established in Kaunas.

Swedish army invades
As Charles reached the Swedish headquarters in Courland, on January 9, 1702, he immediately ordered the main army to prepare for a march into Lithuania — and the inevitable Swedish invasion of Poland — to reinforce Hummerhielm at Kaunas, in contrast to the advice of most of his generals. Hummerhielm's troops remained quite active despite being heavily outnumbered, with an insufficient amount of provisions, forage and ammunition; on March 18, he beat 12 banners of the Wiśniowiecki family — another enemy to the Sapieha's — at Jieznas, and there seized ten metal cannons, of which he could only bring back four to Kaunas. Three days later, a small party of 40 men sent out by Hummerhielm to gather supplies, was attacked at Osinitza by 1,700 men under Michał Serwacy Wiśniowiecki, the Swedes were beaten back with a loss of 17–22 men. The Swedish retaliation did not wait as Hummerhielm assembled a force of 130 cavalry and 100 infantry and marched against the Lithuanians to collect the remaining six guns at Jieznas; these events led to the Battle of Darsūniškis, where the Swedish cavalry was annihilated and Hummerhielm captured. The news of Hummerhielm's defeat deeply angered Charles who promptly proceeded with the advance of the Swedish army into the Commonwealth. This forced Grzegorz party to retreat to the rich-wooded areas in the northeastern Lithuania, from where he would keep harassing the Swedes who were left behind to hold Courland.

Rumours after the battle
Shortly after the battle of Tryškiai and the following chase, the Swedish main army had received rumours saying Charles XII had been killed somewhere between Kaunas and Vilnius; he had supposedly been chasing Grzegorz deep into Lithuania. On the contrary, other rumours spoke of a great battle between Charles and Ogiński's forces; the latter had, with 10,000 men (more than twice as many as the Swedes), been decisively defeated and forced on the run, after having lost 2,000 men killed. These rumours made it into several later publications, including "The History of Poland Under Augustus II", and "The History of the Wars, of His Late Majesty Charles XII, King of Sweden".

Sources

Notes

Citations

Bibliography
 
 
 
 
 
 
 
 
 
 
 

Tryszki
1701 in Europe
Tryszki
Tryszki
Tryszki
Military history of Lithuania
1701 in the Polish–Lithuanian Commonwealth